Botsford may refer to:

Places
Botsford, Connecticut, United States
Botsford Parish, New Brunswick, Canada
Botsford Road, a neighborhood in London, England

as a surname
Amos Botsford (1744–1812), early New Brunswick politician
George Botsford (1874–1949), American Composer
George Willis Botsford (1862–1917), American classist and history professor
Margot Botsford (born 1947), a New York State judge
Botsford is the family name of the heroine of WordGirl